The rue Molière is a short road in central Paris, in the 1st arrondissement. It begins at avenue de l'Opéra, near the Comédie-Française, and ends at the rue de Richelieu with the Fontaine Molière.

It has borne several names, including rue de la Fontaine-Molière, rue Traversière-Saint-Honoré before 1843, earlier the rue Traversine or Traversante, and in 1625 rue de la Brasserie or rue du Bâton-Royal. It is notable for collège Jean-Baptiste-Poquelin, named after the playwright Jean-Baptiste-Poquelin, the real name of Molière.

External links

Moliere